The Cratistii (Greek Kratistioi) were an ancient pre-Roman, stock-raising people whose lands were situated along the upper Tagus valley, in the elevated plateau region of the western Cuenca and northeast Province of Teruel.

Origins 

An intriguing people, their ethnic origins are difficult to determine though their tribal name means "the most powerful".  They bear no close relation to the Caristii who lived further north in the modern Vizcaya and Álava Basque provinces.

Culture 

Archeological evidence retrieved from the cemetery of Madrigueras (Albacete) suggests that their culture was strongly Celtiberianized, being more closely affiliated with that of the neighbouring Olcades. 
Their presumed capital was Segobriga (Cerro de Cabeza de Griego, Saelices – Cuenca; Celtiberian-type mint: Sekobirikes) and they held the important towns of Ercavica (Cañaveruelas – Cuenca; Celtiberian-type mint: Ercauica), and Contrebia Carbica (Fosos de Bayona, Villas Viejas – Cuenca; Celtiberian-type mints: Contebacom/Carbicom/Konterbia Karbica).

History 

Initially a dependent tribe of the Carpetani since at least the early 3rd Century BC, the Cratistii were submitted to Carthaginian rule upon the conquest of eastern Carpetania by Hannibal in 221-220 BC. Later they appear to have gravitated gradually towards the Roman sphere in the aftermath of the 2nd Punic War only to be raided by the Lusitani, who sacked Segobriga in 146 BC. Following the end of the Sertorian Wars in the mid-1st Century BC, the Cratistii regained their independence from the enfeebled Carpetani and were incorporated alongside their Uraci neighbours into romanized southern Celtiberia.

See also 
Carpetani
Celtiberian script
Olcades
Pre-Roman peoples of the Iberian Peninsula
Uraci

Notes

References

 Ángel Montenegro et alii, Historia de España 2 - colonizaciones y formación de los pueblos prerromanos (1200-218 a.C), Editorial Gredos, Madrid (1989) 
 Francisco Burillo Mozota, Los Celtíberos, etnias y estados, Crítica, Grijalbo Mondadori, S.A., Barcelona (1998, revised edition 2007) 
 Juan Pereira Siesto (coord.), Prehistoria y Protohistoria de la Meseta Sur (Castilla-La Mancha), Biblioteca Añil n.º 31, ALMUD, Ediciones de Castilla-La Mancha, Ciudad Real (2007)

External links
http://www.celtiberia.net

Pre-Roman peoples of the Iberian Peninsula
Celtic tribes of the Iberian Peninsula
Ancient peoples of Spain